Alexander Graham Bell Grosvenor (December 7, 1927 – April 7, 1978) was a United States Navy pilot, carrier officer, and avid yachtsman credited with promoting the resurgence of sailing at the United States Naval Academy. He was a great-grandson of the inventor, Alexander Graham Bell, and brother of Gilbert M. Grosvenor, former Chairman of the National Geographic Society.

Early years
Grosvenor was born in 1927, the son of Helen Rowland and Melville Bell Grosvenor, who later became president of the National Geographic Society and editor of the National Geographic Magazine. In 1937, ten-year-old Alex was present when the Smithsonian Institution's secretary, Dr. Charles Abbot, opened three boxes of Bell experimental materials that had been kept locked in the Smithsonian's secret archives.  In September 1942 Alex enrolled at the Taft School, where he played football and was captain of the wrestling team.

Career

Early
Grosvenor enrolled in the United States Naval Academy in 1945. In the summer of 1947, he sailed with many of his classmates on a Navy training exercise to Europe and subsequently wrote about his experiences in an article entitled "Midshipmen's Cruise" in the June 1948 issue of National Geographic, coauthored with fellow midshipman William J. Aston. Grosvenor sailed the Naval Academy's Star in the 1949 World Championships in Chicago, and “finished in the top third of the fleet, an accomplishment, which no former Navy Star had come anywhere near,” reported the Star Class Log. He earned a letter on the varsity dinghy team and was the first midshipman skipper of the yacht ROYONO in the 1950 Bermuda Race. He graduated from the Naval Academy in 1950.

Aviation and carrier duty
Grosvenor first served aboard the Saipan-class light aircraft carrier USS Wright (CVL-49) and then served two tours in Korean waters aboard the s USS Yorktown (CV-10) and USS Essex (CV-9), piloting the Navy's first swept-wing jets. Following a tour as a flight instructor, he served in the Mediterranean aboard the USS Saratoga (CV-60) as aide and flag lieutenant to Commander, Sixth Fleet.

Grosvenor served with Fighter Squadron 21 (VF-21) Freelancers during combat tours in southeast Asia aboard the carriers  USS Coral Sea (CV-43) and USS Ranger (CV-61). An F-4B fighter jet flown by Grosvenor when he was squadron commander of the Freelancers, now known as "The Midway Phantom," is on display at the San Diego Aircraft Carrier Museum.

After graduating from the Naval War College in 1969, Grosvenor served as operations officer of the USS Kitty Hawk (CV-63), and the following year as executive officer. In the early 1970s, Grosvenor served at the Naval Air Station Patuxent River where he was "director of testing for some of the Navy's newest aircraft" according to the Annapolis Capital.

Naval Academy sailing
In March 1975, Grosvenor was appointed commander of the Annapolis Naval Station and commodore of the Naval Academy Sailing Squadron, where he "promoted a resurgence of sailing at the Naval Academy," according to The Washington Post.

"We spent a lot of time upgrading the midshipmen sailing program," recalled Adm. Kinnaird McKee, Superintendent of the Naval Academy at the time, in an interview with the Naval Historical Foundation. "The officer who had that responsibility was Captain Alex Grosvenor (USNA class of ’50). I had sailed in competition with him when I was a plebe and he was a third-classman. He turned our sailing program around. We had been near the bottom in national competition when he arrived – and we won the national championship three years later."

Grosvenor "was instrumental in putting Mids back on blue water," recalls his colleague at the time, Captain Larry Howard, USN (Ret). "In the mid 70's we established an Offshore Division of the Sailing Team that previously was just dinghies and Shields. There is a significant seamanship and leadership impact from training and leading a group of midshipmen on a sailboat offshore. Leadership (as opposed to management) is developed by placing young officers to be in positions where they must make decisions that impact the success (and often safety) of their crew. Offshore sailing is a unique opportunity to provide that experience."

Grosvenor was frequently helped in his sailing duties by his wife, Marcia, who authored a manual on cooking while sailing at sea, Gimbaling Gourmet Galley Guide.

Awards
Capt. Grosvenor received a Distinguished Flying Cross, a Bronze Star, and the Navy Commendation Medal with Combat "V."

Personal
Grosvenor died from a brain tumor in 1978, and his wife Marcia died in 2002. They were interred at the United States Naval Academy Cemetery, according to Find a Grave, and were survived by two daughters, Pam Mongan Taylor and Sandy Grosvenor, and numerous grandchildren.

Legacy

The A.G.B. Grosvenor Trophy is awarded annually to the volunteer member of the Naval Academy Sailing Squadron who has made exemplary contributions to the mission and programs of the sailing squadron. It was established in 1978 to honor Grosvenor, who had been commanding officer of Naval Station Annapolis, and commodore of the Naval Academy Sailing Squadron.

Gallery

References

External links

1927 births
1978 deaths
United States Naval Academy alumni
Aviators from Washington, D.C.
Burials at the United States Naval Academy Cemetery
United States Naval Aviators
United States Navy personnel of the Korean War
United States Navy personnel of the Vietnam War
American Korean War pilots
Deaths from brain cancer in the United States
Deaths from cancer in Maryland
Neurological disease deaths in Maryland